John Corbley Farm, also known as Slave Gallant, is a historic home located at Greene Township in Greene County, Pennsylvania. The house was built about 1796, as a two-story, five bay, brick dwelling on a stone foundation.  It has a gable roof.  Its builder, Rev. John Corbly (1733–1803), was a founder of the local Baptist church and rebel associated with the Whiskey Rebellion.  In 1782, his family was massacred in the Corbly Family massacre. The farm name of 'Slave Gallant' derived from Slieve Gallion in Ireland, which was nearby where John Corbley was born and raised before emigrating to Pennsylvania.

It was listed on the National Register of Historic Places in 1984.

References 

Whiskey Rebellion
Houses on the National Register of Historic Places in Pennsylvania
Houses completed in 1796
Houses in Greene County, Pennsylvania
1796 establishments in Pennsylvania
National Register of Historic Places in Greene County, Pennsylvania